Litobranchus fowleri, Fowler's rockskipper, is a species of combtooth blenny found in coral reefs in the western Pacific ocean.  It can reach a maximum length of  SL. This species is currently the only species in its genus. The specific name hours the American ichthyologist Henry Weed Fowler ((1878-1965).

References

Salarinae
Monotypic marine fish genera
Taxa named by Victor G. Springer
Fish described in 1936